Jaleel Johnson (born July 12, 1994) is an American football defensive end for the Atlanta Falcons of the National Football League (NFL). He played college football at Iowa. Johnson was drafted by the Minnesota Vikings in the fourth round, 109th overall of the 2017 NFL Draft.

Early years
Born in New York City, Johnson grew up in a rough neighborhood in Brooklyn. As a teenager, his parents sent him to live with an aunt in Chicago where he had a better chance to thrive. He played football and wrestled at St. Joseph High School in Westchester, Illinois, where he was a three-year starter as a defensive tackle and offensive lineman and was named first-team All-area. However, in the middle of his junior year, due to a coaching change and a losing season, Johnson transferred to Montini Catholic High School for his senior season, and in his only campaign at Montini, Johnson was named team captain and earned first-team All-state, All-conference and All-area honors as well as prep All-America recognition after helping the Broncos post 12-2 a record while winning the state championship, finishing with a 70-45 victory over Joliet Catholic. He recorded 80 tackles, including five tackles for loss, three sacks and nine pressures. During his time at St. Joseph, Johnson also earned two letters as a heavyweight wrestler.

Regarded as a four-star recruit by Rivals.com, Johnson received scholarship offers from half of the Big Ten. It was Iowa coach Kirk Ferentz who convinced him to play for the Hawkeyes after he sent a personal letter that made an impression on Johnson. He took a few visits to Iowa City and decided to sign with the Hawkeyes. Shortly after Signing Day, Johnson decommitted to take a closer look at Michigan State one more time, but ended up committing back to Iowa.

College career
Johnson played at the University of Iowa from 2012 to 2016. Johnson had to wait a while before getting significant playing time due to Iowa's depth in the interior defensive line. He redshirted in 2012, and played in seven games as a reserve defensive tackle the following season, and then had 11 tackles, 2.5 for loss, as a backup in 2014. Given the starting role as a junior in 2015, Johnson garnered honorable mention All-Big Ten honors. Johnson stepped up his game in 2016, being named first-team All-Conference after leading his team with 10 tackles for loss and 7.5 sacks. In Iowa's biggest game in 2016 against No. 3 Michigan, Johnson was one of the biggest reasons the Hawkeyes won 14-13, as he led the team with 9 tackles, 2 tackles for loss, 1 sack and a safety in the second quarter. According to Pro Football Focus (PFF), Johnson ranked sixth among defensive tackles in pass rush productivity with 43 combined pressures in 330 snaps. During his five-year career with the Hawkeyes, Johnson posted 113 tackles, 18.5 of them for loss and 12.5 sacks.

Statistics

Professional career

Minnesota Vikings
Johnson was drafted by the Minnesota Vikings in the fourth round with the 109th overall selection in the 2017 NFL Draft.

Over his first three seasons in the NFL, Johnson played mainly in a reserve role, making four starts while also recording four sacks over that period, including 3.5 sacks in 2019. In 2020, Johnson moved into a starting role after projected starter Michael Pierce opted out of the season due to concerns over Covid 19. He started all 16 games and recorded 44 tackles and one and a half sacks.

Houston Texans
On April 8, 2021, Johnson signed with the Houston Texans. He was released on August 31, 2021.

New Orleans Saints
On September 6, 2021, Johnson was signed to the New Orleans Saints practice squad.

Houston Texans (second stint)
On September 15, 2021, Johnson was signed by the Texans off the Saints practice squad after defensive lineman Vincent Taylor suffered an ankle injury.

New Orleans Saints (second stint)
On April 4, 2022, Johnson signed with the New Orleans Saints. He was released on August 11, 2022. He was re-signed four days later. He was placed on injured reserve on August 17. On August 23, 2022, he was released with an injury settlement.

Atlanta Falcons
On October 5, 2022, Johnson was signed to the Atlanta Falcons practice squad.

Houston Texans (third stint)
On October 27, 2022, Johnson was signed by the Houston Texans off the Falcons practice squad. He was released on November 19.

Atlanta Falcons (second stint)
On November 21, 2022, Johnson was claimed off waivers by the Atlanta Falcons.

References

External links

Iowa Hawkeyes bio

1994 births
Living people
Sportspeople from Brooklyn
Players of American football from New York City
Sportspeople from DuPage County, Illinois
People from Lombard, Illinois
Players of American football from Illinois
American football defensive tackles
Iowa Hawkeyes football players
Houston Texans players
Minnesota Vikings players
New Orleans Saints players
Atlanta Falcons players